Claudio Josué Albizuris Aguilár (born 1 July 1981) is a Guatemalan former football midfielder who last played for local club Municipal in the Guatemalan top division.

Club career
Albizuris played all of his career at Municipal, after coming through the club's youth ranks to become professional in 2000, only to leave them in June 2010 to join fellow capital side USAC. and come back to Municipal a year after in 2011.

International career
Albizuris made his debut for Guatemala in a June 2001 UNCAF Nations Cup match against Costa Rica and has, by January 2010, earned a total of 34 caps, scoring 1 goal. He represented Guatemala in just 1 FIFA World Cup qualification match and during the 2002 CONCACAF Gold Cup and the 2007 CONCACAF Gold Cup campaign.

International goals
Scores and results list Guatemala's goal tally first.

References

External links

Player profile - CSD Municipal

1981 births
Living people
Sportspeople from Guatemala City
Association football defenders
Guatemalan footballers
Guatemala international footballers
2001 UNCAF Nations Cup players
2002 CONCACAF Gold Cup players
2003 UNCAF Nations Cup players
2007 UNCAF Nations Cup players
2007 CONCACAF Gold Cup players
2009 UNCAF Nations Cup players
C.S.D. Municipal players
Copa Centroamericana-winning players